The Mount Fuji Radar System is a historic weather radar system located on the summit of Mount Fuji, Japan. It was completed on August 15, 1964, and is now recorded on the list of IEEE Milestones in electrical engineering.  When first built, the Mount Fuji Radar System was the world's highest weather radar (elevation 3776 meters), and could observe major weather phenomena, such as destructive typhoons, at a range of more than 800 kilometers. It was designed by the Japan Meteorological Agency and built by Mitsubishi Electric Corporation.

The system is notable for its advances in weather radar technology, remote control, and difficulty of construction, as it required the transport and assembly of some 500 tons of material during mountain's short summer. It operated at a frequency of 2880 megahertz, with output power of 1500 kilowatts, and a pulse width of 3.5 microseconds. Its antenna was a circular dish, 5 meters in diameter, of parabolic shape, rotating at either 3 or 5 revolutions per minute, and housed within a 9-meter radome.

The system was decommissioned in 1999, as it was superseded by weather satellites. The dome, radar dish and support equipment were relocated to a purpose-built museum in Fujiyoshida, Yamanashi in 2001. It was replaced by an automated weather system in 2004.

References 
 Mt. Fuji weather radar station on the IEEE Global Milestones Portal
 Tapan K. Sarkar, Robert Mailloux, Arthur A. Oliner, Magdalena Salazar-Palma, Dipak L. Sengupta, History of Wireless, Wiley-IEEE, 2006, pages 470-471. .
 

Specific

Weather radars
Mount Fuji
Japan Meteorological Agency